Lal Bahadur Shastri is a 2014 Indian Malayalam-language comedy film directed and scripted by Rejishh Midhila. The film is about three strangers who come across during their journey of life. It revolves around how they influence each other. The movie stars Jayasurya, Nedumudi Venu and Aju Varghese in the title roles of Lal, Bahadur and Shasthri respectively while débutante Sandra Simon plays the female lead. The music of the film is composed by Bijibal and the lyrics are penned by Santhosh Varma. The film is produced by Jose Simon and Rajesh George. Jayasurya's son Adwaith made his début in the film. He plays the childhood version of Jayasurya's character in the film.

Plot
Lal is a simple good hearted young man who is search for a job, Bahadhur is a former panchayath president who have an obsession towards liquor and women, and Shasthri is a young farmer who struggles to get some document approved from a Government sector.
The three men, who are total strangers travels to Ernakulam in a KSRTC bus. Bahadhur buys a lottery ticket from a boy and the boy gives another ticket to Lal as he doesn't have change. The trio part ways after reaching Ernakulam; but later come to know that the lottery ticket which Lal got has won one crore rupees. Then Lal, Bahadhur and Shasthri join hands and goes in search of the missing ticket. This forms the crux of the story.

Cast

Jayasurya as Sree Lal
Nedumudi Venu as Bahadur
Aju Varghese as Darmajan Shastri
Sandra Simon as Thara
Mala Aravindan as C. P. Damodharan
Nandhu as Lal's father
Parvathy as Lal's mother
Nobi as Balan
Liimal G Padath as Assistant Director 
Minon as Sreekuttan, the lottery selling boy
Kavitha Nair as Teacher
Pradeep Kottayam as Thara's father
Amith Chakalakkal as Arjun
Adwaith Jayasurya as Lal's childhood
Lakshmipriya as Agricultural officer
Aiswarya Nath

Critical reception 
Lal Bahadur Shastri got mixed to good reviews from
critics."Friends media" gave four out of five stars for the film and
stated that the film is a clean entertainer
"Live media" gave a rating of 4.5/5 for the
movie while "The Cinima Company" gave 3 out of 5
and said "LBS is a one time watchable film without
much expectation that won't make you bored".
LemonMovieMedia rated this as a nice one time
watchable movie, without much twists and turns.
Lay back, relax and watch though it doesn’t offer
anything exceptional or new.
Akhila Menon of "FilmiBeat" gave 2.5/5 and
concluded "A one time watch".

Release
The film released around 80 screens in Kerala. [1] Released on 21 November, distributed by Vendhar Movies in Kerala and Humming Minds Entertainment distributed in outside Kerala

References

External links
 
indiaglitz Lal Bahadur & Shastri is another feel good attempt  
Lal Bahadur Shastri: Three isn't so crowded 
nowrunning 
timesofindia 

2014 films
2010s Malayalam-language films
Indian comedy films
Films shot in Thrissur
Films shot in Kochi